Don Carlos, Prince of Bourbon-Two Sicilies, Infante of Spain (Full Italian name: Carlo Maria Francesco d'Assisi Pasquale Ferdinando Antonio di Padova Francesco de Paola Alfonso Andrea Avelino Tancredi, Principe di Borbone delle Due Sicilie, Infante di Spagna; 10 November 1870 – 11 November 1949) was the son of Prince Alfonso of the Two Sicilies, Count of Caserta and his wife Princess Maria Antonietta of Bourbon-Two Sicilies, and nephew of the last King of the Two Sicilies, Francis II.

Marriages and children
On 14 February 1901 in Madrid, Carlos married Mercedes, Princess of Asturias, elder daughter of the late King Alfonso XII of Spain and of his wife Archduchess Maria Christina of Austria. Mercedes was the elder sister and heir presumptive to King Alfonso XIII of Spain, an unmarried teenager.  A week before the wedding, on 7 February, Carlos was given the title of Infante of Spain.

Carlos and Mercedes had three children:
 Don Alfonso, Prince of the Two Sicilies, Infante of Spain (1901–1964).
 Don Fernando of Bourbon-Two Sicilies (1903–1905), died in San Sebastián one year after his mother's death.
 Doña Isabella Alfonsa, Princess of the Two Sicilies, Infanta of Spain (1904–1985). Married Count Jan Kanty Zamoyski (1900–1961) and had issue.

Mercedes died in childbirth in 1904.

In 1907, Carlos married secondly to Princess Louise of Orléans, daughter of Prince Philippe, Count of Paris. The couple had four children:
 Don Carlos of Bourbon-Two Sicilies (1908–1936). Killed in the Spanish Civil War.
 Doña María de los Dolores of Bourbon-Two Sicilies (1909–1996). In 1937, she married Prince Augustyn Józef Czartoryski (1907–1946) and had one surviving son, Adam. She remarried to Carlos Chias on 1950.
 Doña María de las Mercedes of Bourbon-Two Sicilies (1910–2000) who married Infante Juan, Count of Barcelona and became King Juan Carlos I of Spain's mother.
 Doña María de la Esperanza of Bourbon-Two Sicilies (1914–2005), who married Prince Pedro Gastão of Orléans-Braganza.

Prince Carlos's descendants include King Felipe VI of Spain, Infante Carlos, Duke of Calabria, Prince Pedro Carlos of Orléans-Braganza, and Prince Peter of Yugoslavia, among others.

Military service

Carlos served in the Spanish Army in the Spanish–American War and received the Military Order of Maria Cristina. Eventually he rose to the rank of Inspector General.

Two Sicilies succession
In 1894, Carlos's father Alfonso became the head of the House of Bourbon-Two Sicilies. On marrying his first wife, Carlos renounced his rights of succession to the Crown of Two Sicilies on 14 December 1900. In 1960, Carlos's older brother Ferdinand died without male issue, and Carlos' son Alfonso reclaimed his rights. However, Carlos's younger brother Ranieri objected and also claimed rights based on the renunciation of 1900. The dispute is still not resolved. While most royal houses in Europe recognize the claim of Ranieri's descendants, the Spanish Royal House recognizes the claim of Carlos's descendants.

Honours 

 :
 Knight of the Distinguished Order of the Golden Fleece, 7 February 1901
 Grand Cross of the Royal and Distinguished Order of Charles III, with Collar, 7 February 1901
 Grand Cross of the Royal Order of Isabella the Catholic, 7 February 1901
 Grand Commander of the Order of Alcántara, 21 March 1901
 Grand Cross of the Order of Military Merit, with Red Decoration, 4 May 1910
 Grand Cross of the Order of Naval Merit, with White Decoration, 10 October 1923
 Grand Cross of the Royal and Military Order of Saint Hermenegild, 8 July 1929
 Grand Cross of the Military Order of Maria Cristina
 Knight of the Royal Nobility Corps of the Principality of Girona
 : Knight of the Royal Order of Saint Hubert, 1897
 Siam: Knight of the Order of the Royal House of Chakri, 8 June 1902
 : Honorary Knight Grand Cross of the Most Honourable Order of the Bath (civil), 27 January 1903

Ancestry

References

External links

Pretenders to the throne of the Kingdom of the Two Sicilies
Princes of Bourbon-Two Sicilies
1870 births
1949 deaths
People from Bolzano
Italian Roman Catholics
Spanish Roman Catholics
19th-century Roman Catholics
20th-century Roman Catholics
Spanish captain generals
Knights of the Golden Fleece of Spain
Knights Grand Cross of the Order of Isabella the Catholic
Grand Crosses of the Royal and Military Order of San Hermenegild
Knights of the Order of Alcántara
Grand Crosses of Military Merit
Grand Crosses of Naval Merit
Honorary Knights Grand Cross of the Order of the Bath